Fritz von Thurn und Taxis (born Friedrich Leonhard Ignatius Josef Maria Lamoral Balthasar Thurn and Taxis on 22 June 1950 in Linz, Upper Austria, Allied-occupied Austria is an Austrian journalist and a member of the Bohemian line of the Princely House of Thurn and Taxis. He became well known as a longtime sportscaster on the Bayerisches Fernsehen television channel. Since 1993, Thurn und Taxis has been a football commentator on the pay television channel Sky Deutschland.

Life and career

Thurn und Taxis was the third child and second son of Prince Johann von Nepomuk von Thurn und Taxis and his wife, Princess Maria Julia von Lobkowicz.

His journalistic career began in 1971 with the Bayerischen Rundfunk. There, Thurn und Taxis worked in both television and in radio programs as a sports reporter and commentator and reported on several Olympic Games, football, skiing, and Ice Hockey World Championships events.

In honor of his years of reporting on the Ice Hockey World Championships, the International Ice Hockey Federation (IIHF) awarded Thurn und Taxis with an IIHF gold medal. Later, he hosted the sports magazine show Blickpunkt Sport on Bayerischen Rundfunk and moderated the Sportschau on ARD. Beginning in August 1993, Thurn und Taxis began hosting live Fußball-Bundesliga matches on the Munich-based pay television channel Sky Deutschland.

Marriage
Thurn und Taxis married morganatically to Beata Béry, daughter of Laszlo Béry and his wife Countess Paula Apponyi de Nagy-Appony, on 4 June 1977 in Munich, Bavaria, Germany.

Ancestry

References

External links
 

1950 births
Living people
Friedrich of Thurn And Taxis, Prince
People from Linz
Association football commentators
Austrian journalists
Sports journalists
German journalists
German male journalists
German sports journalists
Ice hockey commentators
Austrian Roman Catholics
German Roman Catholics
German male writers
Bayerischer Rundfunk people